The Alhambra Theatre & Dining in Jacksonville, Florida, is the oldest continuously-running professional dinner theater in the United States, and the only professional resident theatre in Northeast Florida.

History
The Alhambra was built by Jacksonville businessman Leon Simon in 1967 and purchased by Tod Booth, Sr. in 1984. Booth moved to Jacksonville from Chicago, where he worked as artistic director for the Drury Lane Theaters. His family has frequently been involved, with daughter Jessica Booth and wife Lisa Valdini appearing in a number of shows and son Tod Jr. contributing in various aspects, including acting, directing and stage managing of the dinner theatre before becoming general manager and director of the Alhambra's Children's Theatre.

As with other dinner theaters of the 1970s, Alhambra initially relied on the appeal of former stars of film, television and music to attract customers. Alhambra's first such headliner was in Barefoot in the Park in 1969, which featured former Gilligan's Island costar Dawn Wells. Stars earned weekly pay between $1,500 and $5,000 for six to eight weeks as well as being able to enjoy the weather and amenities in Florida. According to Booth, "When their careers cooled, a star could learn a show and take it on the dinner theater circuit. That one show could be a meal ticket for a year or two." 
Other celebrities, including soap opera cast members, hosts from TV game shows, and Playboy Centerfold gals appeared in productions. 
In the early 1980s, however, it became difficult to hire former big names to act in dinner theatre. Booth explained: "They could make more in a day doing a commercial than they could make during the entire run of dinner theater show, and they didn't have to travel. Plus, a lot of the stars just started dying off." As a result, few of the performers had familiar names, but all were professionals, most with extensive experience on stage, in movies and TV. The show itself was promoted, rather than the headliner.

Notable appearances
Since the 1970s, over 100 stars have graced the Alhambra stage:

The theatre features three-course served dinners and a full bar service. The bar hosts patrons who arrive early for happy hour. The facility uses a Thrust stage to give all 408 seats an excellent view. Several staff members have been at the venue for over 25 years.

Brief closure
On August 31, 2009, the Alhambra Dinner Theatre suspended operations, citing the effect of the Late-2000s recession on attendance and expenses. The sale of the theatre to Theatre Partners, a group of local investors, was announced on October 28, 2009.

The group stated that operations would resume December 1, 2009, with Christmas Carole, which has been a fixture in Jacksonville for more than 20 years. Former owner Tod Booth agreed to direct the shows, which were the primary attraction. The food was placed under the direction of DeJuan Roy, a popular local restaurateur, who has changed the menu with each show; table service replaced the buffet style of serving. The building's decor has been spruced up with new flooring, fixtures, paint and table place settings.

The new ownership group hosted a free outdoor dinner show on November 7, 2009, to celebrate the revival of the local theatre landmark. Chef Medure cooked on a grill and performers entertained with classic show tunes. It was announced that the first show for the 2010 Season would be High School Musical beginning December 30, 2009.

Actors' Equity Association Do Not Work Order 
The Alhambra Dinner Theatre is currently on the Actors' Equity Association's Do Not Work list meaning that members of AEA are not permitted to work on any production produced or performed at the Alhambra Dinner Theatre under penalty of suspension or permanent expulsion not only from AEA but from the unions affiliated with the Associated Actors and Artistes of America known as the 4As unions which includes SAG-AFTRA, American Guild of Musical Artists, American Guild of Variety Artists and the Guild of Italian American Actors.

See also
 List of dinner theaters
 Cabaret

References

External links
Alhambra Dinner Theatre website
National Dinner Theater Association website

Dinner theatre
Theatres in Jacksonville, Florida
Southside, Jacksonville
1967 establishments in Florida